Nathaniel Barksdale Dial (April 24, 1862December 11, 1940) was a United States senator from South Carolina from 1919 to 1925.

Biography
Born near Laurens, he attended the common schools, Richmond College (Virginia) and Vanderbilt University. He studied law at the University of Virginia at Charlottesville, was admitted to the bar in 1883, and commenced practice in Laurens. He was mayor of Laurens from 1887 to 1891 and again in 1895; he declined the office of consul to Zurich, Switzerland, tendered by President Grover Cleveland in 1893. Dial engaged in banking and in various manufacturing enterprises, and was an unsuccessful candidate for election to the United States Senate in 1912; he was, however, elected in 1918 as a Democrat to the U.S. Senate and served from March 4, 1919, to March 4, 1925; he was an unsuccessful candidate for renomination in 1924 and in 1925 was a member of the commission to report on the use of the nitrate plant at Muscle Shoals, Alabama. He resumed the practice of law in South Carolina and Washington, D.C., and also his former manufacturing enterprises in South Carolina; Dial died in Washington, D.C., in 1940; and is interred at the Laurens City Cemetery.

References

 Nathaniel B. Dial letter on Footnote.com

1862 births
1940 deaths
South Carolina lawyers
Mayors of places in South Carolina
Democratic Party United States senators from South Carolina
South Carolina Democrats
Florence–Muscle Shoals metropolitan area
Vanderbilt University alumni
People from Laurens, South Carolina